Mario Ernesto Mayén Meza (born 19 May 1968 in La Libertad, El Salvador) is a retired Salvadoran professional footballer.

Club career
Mayén Meza has played for three of the 'Big Four' of Salvadoran football: Alianza, FAS and Águila. He finished his career at San Salvador F.C., with whom he won their first league title.

International career
Nicknamed el Negro, Mayén made his debut for El Salvador in an April 1991 UNCAF Nations Cup qualification match against Nicaragua and has earned a total of 36 caps, scoring no goals. He has represented his country in 6 FIFA World Cup qualification matches and played at the 1991, 1993, 1995 and 1997 UNCAF Nations Cups as well as at the 1996 CONCACAF Gold Cup

His final international match was a May 1997 World Cup qualification match against Jamaica.

Retirement
Formally, his name is Meza Mayén instead of Mayén Meza because his father's name is Meza. He was also nicknamed el Tiburón (the Shark), since he used to smell like fish at the training ground after first helping his mother in her fish shops. He now runs his own seafood business in La Libertad and has been an assistant coach  with San Salvador F.C., where he was dismissed in April 2007, Luis Ángel Firpo and Águila.

References

External links
 

1968 births
Living people
People from La Libertad Department (El Salvador)
Association football defenders
Salvadoran footballers
El Salvador international footballers
1996 CONCACAF Gold Cup players
Alianza F.C. footballers
C.D. FAS footballers
C.D. Águila footballers
San Salvador F.C. footballers